Man in the Long Black Coat is a tribute album to Bob Dylan recorded by Barb Jungr.  The album is named after a Dylan song of the same name.

Track listing 
All tracks composed by Bob Dylan
"Man in the Long Black Coat" – 4:17
"The Times They Are a-Changin'" – 3:14
"It Ain't Me Babe" – 4:04
"Just Like a Woman" – 5:32
"Like a Rolling Stone" – 6:00
"Trouble in Mind" – 4:32
"Tomorrow Is a Long Time" – 5:58
"High Water (For Charlie Patton)" – 5:47
"Sara" – 5:02
"Ballad of Hollis Brown" – 4:53
"Blind Willie McTell" – 4:14
"With God On Our Side" – 4:04
"I Shall Be Released" – 5:33

Personnel

Musicians 
Barb Jungr - vocals, tambourine
Geoff Gascoyne - bass (tracks 5, 8)
Nic France - drums (tracks 5, 8)
Matt Backer - guitars (tracks 5, 8)
Adrian York - piano (tracks 5, 8)
Jonathan Cooper - clarinets, piano, keyboard samples, soundscape (tracks 7, 13)
Miriam Teppich - violin (tracks 7, 13)
Dominika Rosiek - violin (tracks 7, 13)
Rebecca Brown- viola (tracks 7, 13)
Thangam Debbonaire - cello (tracks 7, 13)
Billy Jackson - harp (tracks 7, 13)
Mario Castronari - acoustic bass (tracks 7, 13)
Jenny Carr - piano, musical director, backing vocals, percussion] (tracks 1–4, 6, 9-12)
Jessica Lauren - harmonicas, organ, bass piano, backing vocals, mbira, autoharp, mellotron, electronic tanpura (tracks 2, 4, 6, 10-11)
Steve Watts - bass (tracks 6, 11)
Roy Dodds - drums, percussion (tracks 6, 11)
Gabriella Swallow - cello (tracks 6, 11)
Eric Bibb - guitars (tracks 6, 11)
Johnny Lee - percussion, drums, clock sample (tracks 2, 4, 10)
Danny Thompson - bass (tracks 2, 4, 10)
Mark Lockheart - saxophones, clarinets (tracks 2, 4, 10)

Other personnel 
Calum Malcolm - engineer
John Haxby - design
Steve Ullathorne - photography
Habie Schwarz - photography

See also
List of songs written by Bob Dylan
List of artists who have covered Bob Dylan songs

2011 albums
Bob Dylan tribute albums